In Greek mythology, Dryops (Ancient Greek: Δρύοψ means 'oak-face', 'wood-face' or 'wood-eater') was the king of the Dryopians.

Family 
Dryops was the son of the river god Spercheus and the Danaid Polydora, or of Apollo by Dia, daughter of King Lycaon of Arcadia. As a newborn infant, he was concealed by Dia in a hollow oak-tree. He had one daughter, Dryope, and also a son Cragaleus.

Reign 
Dryops had been king of the Dryopes, who derived their name from him. The Asinaeans in Messenia worshipped him as their ancestral hero, and as a son of Apollo, and celebrated a festival in honour of him every other year. His heroum there was adorned with a very archaic statue of the hero. Dryops reigned in the neighborhood of Mount Oeta. The people, original inhabitants of the country from the valley of the Spercheius and Thermopylae, as far as Mount Parnassus.  They retained the name after having transferred to Asine in Peloponnesus.

Notes

Kings in Greek mythology
Children of Potamoi
Children of Apollo
Demigods in classical mythology

References 

 Antoninus Liberalis, The Metamorphoses of Antoninus Liberalis translated by Francis Celoria (Routledge 1992). Online version at the Topos Text Project.
 Pausanias, Description of Greece with an English Translation by W.H.S. Jones, Litt.D., and H.A. Ormerod, M.A., in 4 Volumes. Cambridge, MA, Harvard University Press; London, William Heinemann Ltd. 1918. Online version at the Perseus Digital Library
 Pausanias, Graeciae Descriptio. 3 vols. Leipzig, Teubner. 1903.  Greek text available at the Perseus Digital Library.
 Strabo, The Geography of Strabo. Edition by H.L. Jones. Cambridge, Mass.: Harvard University Press; London: William Heinemann, Ltd. 1924. Online version at the Perseus Digital Library.
 Strabo, Geographica edited by A. Meineke. Leipzig: Teubner. 1877. Greek text available at the Perseus Digital Library.
 The Homeric Hymns and Homerica with an English Translation by Hugh G. Evelyn-White. Homeric Hymns. Cambridge, MA.,Harvard University Press; London, William Heinemann Ltd. 1914. Online version at the Perseus Digital Library. Greek text available from the same website.